Atwater may refer to:

Places
 Atwater, California, a city in Merced County, California
 Atwater Village, Los Angeles, a neighborhood of the city of Los Angeles in Los Angeles County, California
 Atwater, Georgia
 Atwater, Illinois
 Atwater, Minnesota
 Atwater Township, Portage County, Ohio
 Atwater (CDP), Ohio, a census-designated place in the township
 Atwater, Saskatchewan, a village in Saskatchewan, Canada
 Atwater, Wisconsin

People with the surname
 Ann Atwater (1935–2016), American civil rights activist
 Barry Atwater (1918–1978), American actor
 Caleb Atwater (1778–1867), American politician, historian, and early archaeologist
 Dorence Atwater (1845–1910), American civil war soldier known for keeping the "Atwater List" of Union fatalities
 Edwin Atwater (1808–1874), municipal alderman in Montreal for the district of Saint-Antoine
 Harry Atwater (born 1960), professor of physics at California Institute of Technology
 Helen W. Atwater (1876–1947), American author, home economist and editor
 Isaac Atwater (1818–1906), American jurist
 Jeff Atwater (born 1958), American politician
 Jeremiah Atwater (born 1773), American educator, minister, and President of Middlebury College
 John Atwater (died 1499), Irish politician 
 Lee Atwater (1951–1991), American Republican political strategist
 Mary Meigs Atwater (1878-1956), American handweaver, author, founder of the Shuttle-craft Guild
 Reuben Atwater (1768–1831), American politician
 Richard M. Atwater (1844–1922), American chemist
 Richard and Florence Atwater (1892–1948; 1899–1979), authors of the children's book Mr. Popper's Penguins
 Steve Atwater (born 1966), former Denver Broncos and New York Jets Free Safety
 Tanya Atwater (born 1942), professor of geological sciences at the University of California, Santa Barbara who specializes in plate tectonics
 Tony Atwater, president of Indiana University of Pennsylvania
 Wilbur Olin Atwater (1844–1907), American developer of the respiration calorimeter
 William Atwater (curator) (born 1945), Director of the U.S. Army Ordnance Museum in Maryland

Other
 Atwater (Montreal Metro), a station on the Green Line of the Montreal Metro
 Atwater Avenue, a street in Montreal
 Atwater Library of the Mechanics' Institute of Montreal, an independent library in Montreal operated by the Mechanics' Institute of Montreal
 Atwater Market, a public market in Montreal
 Atwater v. City of Lago Vista, a United States Supreme Court case
 United States Penitentiary, Atwater, a prison near Atwater, California
 The Atwater system for calculating the energy content of food (named after Wilbur Olin Atwater)

See also
Attwater, a surname